Howard Lee may refer to:

 Howard Lee (sailor) (1935–2012), Bermudian Olympic sailor
 Howard Nathaniel Lee (born 1934), North Carolina politician
 Howard B. Lee (1879–1985), former West Virginia Attorney General
 Howard V. Lee (1933–2019), U.S. Medal of Honor recipient
 Howie Lee (1931–2014), Canadian ice hockey player
 W. Howard Lee (1908–1981), spouse of Hedy Lamarr and then Gene Tierney
 A pseudonym of Ron Goulart

See also
 Howard Leigh (born 1940), Australian boxing announcer